Tis the SeaSon is the second Christmas album by American singer-songwriter Jimmy Buffett, and is his twenty-ninth studio album overall. Released on October 28, 2016, it is the follow-up to Buffett's Christmas Island, released twenty years prior. After the recording of the album was mentioned in interviews and on social media throughout summer 2016, the name, album cover, and release date were officially announced on September 26, 2016.

Commercial performance
The album debuted on Billboard 200 at No. 50, and at the Top Country Albums at No. 6, selling 10,000 copies in its first week.  The album has sold 56,500 copies in the United States as of December 2016.

Track listing

Personnel
Credits from AllMusic.
Jimmy Buffett – All vocals
Robert Greenidge – Featured artist
Mac McAnally – Producer
Nadriah Shakoor – Featured artist
Jake Shimabukuro – Featured artist
Michael Utley – Producer

Charts

Weekly charts

Year-end charts

References

Jimmy Buffett albums
2016 Christmas albums
Christmas albums by American artists
Country Christmas albums
Mailboat Records albums
Pop rock Christmas albums